The Parker Covered Bridge, near Upper Sandusky, Ohio, was built in 1873 and was listed on the National Register of Historic Places in 1975.

It is a Howe truss covered bridge built by J.C. Davis.

The bridge was burned on May 17, 1991 and was restored in 1993.

It is covered in the Ohio Historic Places Dictionary.

References

External links

Covered bridges in Ohio
National Register of Historic Places in Wyandot County, Ohio
Buildings and structures completed in 1873